Moar may refer to:

 Moar Mound and Village Site, an archaeological site near Morrow, Ohio, US
 mOAR, a division of Seattle, Washington-based music label And/oar
 Mother of All Rallies (M.O.A.R.), a 2017 rally at the National Mall in Washington, D.C., in support of President Donald Trump

People with the surname Moar
 Brendan Moar, Australian television presenter
 Kelly Moar, Provincial Court of Manitoba (Canada) judge
 Maud Adelaide Moar, wife of Prince Edward Island (Canada) judge Austin Levi Fraser
 May Moar (1825–1894), UK Lifeboat rescuer

See also
 More (disambiguation)